Szydłowiec (Hebrew: שידלוביץ, Yiddish: שידלאָווצע; German: Schiedlowietz) is a town in Szydłowiec County, Mazovian Voivodeship, south-central Poland, with 5,243 inhabitants (December 31, 2005). It is the seat of Gmina Szydłowiec (commune). Szydłowiec is part of the historic region of Lesser Poland.

History 

From the 12th century the environs of Szydłowiec belonged to the powerful knightly family of Odrowąż, who were descended from Moravian-Bohemian Baworowic family.

In the 13th century the site of the present castle was occupied by a stronghold on an artificial island with wood and earth defences and by a village called Szydłowiec. The present town came into being in the early 15th century. It was a private town, administratively located in the Radom County in the Sandomierz Voivodeship in the Lesser Poland Province of the Kingdom of Poland, and together with the neighbouring estate was the property of the Szydłowiecki and Radziwiłł families until the 19th century.

The town flourished in the 16th and the first half of 17th centuries. It was then an important centre of trade and crafts, mainly stone-masonry based on the exploitation of the local sandstone which was easy to work. This stone was used to carve architectural sculptural elements and to make tools for agriculture. It was also a building material for the local Saint Sigismund Church, Castle and the Town Hall; moreover, it was sent to Kielce, Kraków and Warsaw.

Among the goods traded in were agricultural products.

The period of wars 1648–1717 and numerous epidemics and fires brought about a decline of Szydłowiec, which persisted for centuries, its state being yet aggravated after the partitions of Poland. The town owes this present character to transformations in urban design and architecture which took place in the second half of the 19th century and in the 20th century.

The town was annexed by Austria in the Third Partition of Poland in 1795. It was regained by Poles following the Austro–Polish War of 1809, and included within the short-lived Duchy of Warsaw. After the duchy's dissolution, in 1815, it fell to the Russian Partition of Poland. On January 22–23, 1863, it was the site of the Battle of Szydłowiec between Polish insurgents and Russian troops during the January Uprising. After World War I, in 1918, Poland regained independence and control of the town.

Following the joint German-Soviet invasion of Poland, which started World War II in September 1939, the town was occupied by Germany until 1945. The occupiers carried out deportations of Jews to forced labour, and eventually the local Jewish community was destroyed by the Germans in the Holocaust. Polish villagers and military took advantage of the chaos to loot the property of the Jews of Szydłowiec. There are known cases of local Poles who were arrested and sent to concentration camps by the Germans for producing and giving false identity cards to Jews to save them from the Holocaust. Also Jews escaping from Kozienice were directed to Szydłowiec in order to get help from local Poles.

At one point it had a population that was of a Jewish majority.  It was home to Grand Rabbi Natan David Rabinowitz (d. 1865), the grandson of Grand Rabbi Yaakov Yitzchak Rabinowicz of Peshischa, and the father of the Biala Hasidic dynasty.

It was administratively located in the Radom Voivodeship from 1975 to 1998.

Sports
It competes in the lower leagues.

Gallery

References

External links

 "Here Their Stories Will Be Told..." The Valley of the Communities at Yad Vashem, Szydłowiec, at Yad Vashem website.
 

 
Cities and towns in Masovian Voivodeship
Szydłowiec County
Sandomierz Voivodeship
Radom Governorate
Kielce Voivodeship (1919–1939)